Nadia Labidi (née Cherabi; born 18 July 1954) is an Algerian film producer, film director, and politician. She was Minister of Culture from 5 May 2014 to May 2015. Her filmmaking is "French based and French funded". Her first documentary film was Fatima Amaria in 1993 and her first feature film was The Other side of the Mirror in 2007.

Early years and education
Labidi was born in Aïn Madhi in 1954. She studied sociology at the University of Algiers and received a Ph.D. at the Sorbonne (Cinematography, 1987).

Career
From 1978 until 1994, Labidi worked at the Algerian Centre for Art and the Film Industry Centre Algérien pour l'Art et l'Industrie Cinématographiques (CAAIC) as director of production. She was also a professor at the Faculty of Information Sciences and Communication of the University Algiers III before she became  Minister of Culture in the Government of Algeria on 6 May 2014.

In 1991, Labidi served as assistant director at the Algerian newsreel organization, Agence Nationale des Actualités Filmées (ANAF). At CAAIC, she transferred her attention from production to film-making with a particular interest in  docudrama. She directed L'exile de Bougie (The Exile of Bougie; 1997) and Fatima Amaria (with Malek Laggoune, 1993).

Labidi founded the production company Procom International in 1994. For many years, Procom International was dedicated exclusively to documentaries and ensured the production of thirty programs for Algerian television. In 2002, the company expanded into fiction and feature films (shot in 35mm), which were co-produced with Algerian television (ENTV) and with the support of the Ministry of Culture.

Fatima Amaria, made in 1993, was Labidi's first documentary film, looks at the life of a young woman in a religious community in southern Algeria; the women involved had never been filmed before, so Labidi felt it was important to win their trust before filming.

Her debut feature film as director was The Other side of the Mirror (L'envers du miroir, 2007). She was also involved with Procom in the production of two other feature films: Women Alive (Vivantes!/A'ichhate, 2006) with well-known director Saïd Ould Khelifa and Wounded Palms (Les palmiers blesses, 2010) with the Tunisian director Abdllatif ben Ammar.

Filmography
 1993, Fatima Amaria
 2007, The Other Side of the Mirror 
 2008, Women Alive! / Vivantes! / A'ichate (producer) 
 2010, Wounded Palms / Les palmiers blesses (producer)

References

Bibliography

Culture ministers of Algeria
1954 births
Living people
Algerian film directors
Algerian women film directors
Algerian film producers
Algerian women film producers
University of Algiers alumni
Academic staff of the University of Algiers
University of Paris alumni
Women government ministers of Algeria
People from Laghouat Province
21st-century Algerian women politicians
21st-century Algerian politicians